Where Angels Fear to Tread is a 1905 novel by E. M. Forster.

It may also refer to:

Where Angels Fear to Tread (Mink DeVille album), 1983
"... Where Angels Fear to Tread", 1998 novella by Allen Steele
Where Angels Fear to Tread (Matt Redman album), 2002, or the title track
Where Angels Fear to Tread (film), 1991
"Where Angels Fear to Tread", a song by Disclosure, 2018

See also
Fools rush in where angels fear to tread, a line first written by Alexander Pope in his 1711 poem An Essay on Criticism